Beck – Monstret (English: Beck – The Monster) is a 1998 film about the Swedish police detective Martin Beck directed by Harald Hamrell.

Cast 
 Peter Haber as Martin Beck
 Mikael Persbrandt as Gunvald Larsson
 Stina Rautelin as Lena Klingström
 Per Morberg as Joakim Wersén
 Ingvar Hirdwall as Martin Beck's neighbour
 Rebecka Hemse as Inger (Martin Beck's daughter)
 Fredrik Ultvedt as Jens Loftsgård
 Peter Hüttner as Oljelund
 Björn Gedda as Sture Andersson
 Magnus Roosmann as Gert Ahlgren
 Hans Jonsson as Ove Lundin
 Anna Lindholm as Anita
 Sten Ljunggren as Anita's father

References

External links 

1990s Swedish-language films
Martin Beck films
1998 television films
1998 films
1998 crime films
Swedish crime films
Swedish television films
Films directed by Harald Hamrell
1990s police procedural films
1990s Swedish films